Vesa Ilmari Viitakoski (born February 13, 1971 in Lappeenranta, Finland) is a former professional ice hockey player.

Career
Viitakoski started his professional career in his home town, Lappeenranta, playing for two seasons in the local club, SaiPa. When SaiPa was relegated at the end of the 1990 SM-liiga season, Viitakoski moved to Tappara Tampere. After three seasons there and a strong performance in the national team, especially in the 1992 IIHF World Championships from which Team Finland came home with silver medals, he signed with the Calgary Flames.

All in all, Viitakoski appeared in 23 NHL games with the Flames in the 1993–94, 94–95 and 95–96 seasons, scoring two goals and providing four assists. He also played 198 AHL games as a member of the Saint John Flames and Cornwall Aces squads, with a point total of 72+106=178. Despite this consistent strong performance in the AHL he never broke through in the NHL; this has been attributed to disfavor by the then head coach Dave King.

Abandoning hope for an NHL career, Viitakoski returned to Europe to play for HV71 in the Swedish Elitserien during the 1996–1997 season. After one season there he came back to Finland and Tampere, but not to Tappara but their local rival, Ilves. Since then, Viitakoski played in Ilves, except for one and a half seasons spent in Brynäs IF of the Elitserien, in 2004–05, until he signed with Kärpät in April 2008.

Career statistics

Regular season and playoffs

International

References

External links 

1971 births
Living people
Calgary Flames draft picks
Calgary Flames players
Finnish ice hockey left wingers
Saint John Flames players
Cornwall Aces players
Ilves players
People from Lappeenranta
SaiPa players
Tappara players
Sportspeople from South Karelia